The SMZ cyclecar was a Soviet microcar, manufactured in Serpukhov, Russia, by Serpukhov Motor Works (Serpukhovskiy Motozavod), later known as the now-defunct SeAZ. The most common models were the S-3A (S-Three-A) and S-3D (S-Three-D). They were specially designed for disabled drivers and were distributed in the USSR free or at a large discount through the Soviet Union's social welfare system, and were not officially sold to non-disabled people.
The S-3A-M was produced between 1958 and 1970.

The S-3D, produced between 1970 and 1997, was a twin-seat, four-wheeled cyclecar,  in length, but rather heavy (≈500 kg) due to all-steel body. It was powered by IZH-P3 air-cooled two-stroke engine (18 DIN hp).

In the USSR the model was commonly known as a "motor-wheelchair" (invalidka) because they were only leased via the social care system to disabled people for five years without permission to sell (in a similar way to the British Invacars, made by AC, Thundersley and Tippen). After five years of use, a lessee had to return his "motor-wheelchair" to the social care organisations, and was given a new one.

Like the Invacars, not all "invalidkas" were scrapped, because some of their disabled lessees managed to register them as their private property. However, nowadays they are rare, and earlier models are exceptionally rare and have become collectors' items.

Since the 1980s the use of SMZ cars has been in decline because disabled drivers prefer to use conventional cars with modified controls: Zaporozhets models, for instance, or the later VAZ-1111 "Oka", which were sold to them at substantial discounts. Nevertheless, the last 300 S-3Ds left the SeAZ factory as late as autumn 1997.

S-3D production was discontinued without a direct replacement. The VAZ-1111 "Oka", which filled this role later, was a much larger, four-seater car.

S-3A specifications
 Weight – 
 Length – 
 Max velocity – 
 cylinder – 346 cc,  in diameter
 max power –

S-3D specifications
 Weight – 
 Dimensions – 2595 mm 102in(length) x 1380 mm 54in(width) x 1350 mm 53in(height)
 Track width – 
 Wheelbase – 
 Min turning radius – 3,8 – 4,2 m
 Max velocity – 
 Fuel consumption – 
 Engine – IZH-P3-01, located in the rear
 cylinder – 346 cc,  in diameter
 piston stroke – 
 max power – 
 compression index – 7,5–8
 four-stage gearbox

Welfare cars

References

External links
 SZA images on LiveJournal
 SZD 

City cars
Soviet automobiles
Microcars
Subcompact cars
Convertibles
Cars introduced in 1958